Xura, Inc. (NASDAQ: MESG), previously known as Comverse, Inc., was a technology company headquartered in Wakefield, Massachusetts,  United States, in existence from 2013 to 2017, that offered a portfolio of digital services which enabled global communications across a variety of mobile devices and platforms. Xura marketed and sold to communications service providers (CSPs) and to enterprises.

History

Subsidiary of Comverse Technology

For many years, Comverse, also known as Comverse Network Systems, was part of the more widely known Comverse Technology, which had several wholly or partly owned subsidiaries. The name "Comverse" is a portmanteau of the words "communication" and "versatility".
As a U.S. subsidiary, Comverse was incorporated on November 19, 1997, as part of the larger Comverse Technology.

In August 2012, a series of transactions were announced that would end Comverse Technology as a functioning entity, by making Comverse Network Systems an independent company once again known simply as Comverse, allowing Verint Systems (the former Comverse Infosys) to buy back Comverse Technology's majority stake in it, and selling off other subsidiaries.   Philippe Tartavull was named as the CEO of the independent Comverse.

These transactions were completed by February 4, 2013, and represented the effective liquidation of the Comverse Technology holding entity and the emergence of Comverse, Inc. as a fully independent company.

Comverse, Inc.

Results for fiscal year 2011, which took place as the spin-off of Comverse from Comverse Technology was happening, demonstrated a return to profitability, with a net income of $5.1 million.

In March 2015 Comverse had 3,000 employees, of whom 750 were located in Israel. Company headquarters were located in Wakefield, Massachusetts in the United States.

The company focuses on providing Business Support Systems (BSS), data policy (PCEF, PCRF), traditional and IP-based value-added services to telecommunication and other service providers, complemented by professional and managed services. 
Comverse's products and solutions included
Traditional VAS (TVAS) - Digital Services from the Cloud (mVas),
Unified Communications - Cloud Business VoIP & UC,
and the Evolved Communication Suite.
	
During June 2015 Comverse divested its BSS business to Amdocs. In August 2015 Comverse announced it had completed the previously-announced acquisition of Acision, a privately held firm that specialized in secure mobile messaging and engagement services.

Xura

Following Comverse Inc.'s acquisition of Acision on 6 August 2015, a company name change was made. Xura, Inc. was launched  on 9 September 2015, as the new brand of the combined entity.  The name 'Xura' was adapted from the word 'Aura'.   Xura would also be renaming all Comverse and Acision subsidiaries.

Philippe Tartavull continued as President and CEO of Xura.  The company's core products focus was in Digital Communications Services and Converged Communications (traditional and IP).  The Xura stock symbol was MESG and it was listed on the NASDAQ exchange.

The goal of Xura was to assist customers to navigate and monetize the digital ecosystem through cloud-based offerings. Its solutions found use in over 350 service providers and enterprises across over 100 countries.

On May 23, 2016, Xura announced an agreement to be acquired by affiliates of Siris Capital Group for $25.00 per share in an all-cash deal valued at approximately $643 million. This transaction was closed on August 19, 2016, when the acquisition completed taking Xura, Inc. from public to privately backed by affiliates of Siris Capital Group, LLC.

The transaction saw Hubert de Pesquidoux, a Siris Capital Executive Partner, take the role as Xura’s new Executive Chairman.

Merger to Mavenir
On December 19, 2016, affiliates of Xura entered into agreements to acquire Mitel Mobility, a division of Mitel Networks Corporation  for $385 million, and Ranzure Networks, Inc., an early-stage venture focused on developing 5G cloud-based radio access network technology, for an undisclosed sum. On February 8, 2017, this deal completed, and Xura was subsumed into a new entity known as Mavenir.

Products and services 
Xura's products and solutions belonged to three categories:

 Digital Communications:
Xura Communications Suite.
Messaging Infrastructure
Call Completion
Network Signaling Security
Messaging Security
Monetization
Low Credit Services
Advanced Value Added Services
Enterprise
White-label Communications Application (fuseMe)
Secure Communications
Rich Web and Mobile Application Development Framework (forge)

Industry recognition
During the years of its existence, Xura (and Comverse, Inc.) won a number of awards within its industry, including:
 2015 – Comverse Receives 2015 WebRTC Product of the Year Award   
 2014 – Pipeline's COMET (Communication and Entertainment) Innovation Award to Comverse Evolved Communication Suite (ECS)  
 2014 – TMC's Communications Solutions Product of the Year Award: Comverse ONE BSS 
 2014 – TMC's Communications Solutions Product of the Year Award: Comverse Evolved Communication Suite (ECS)
 2012, 2013, 2014 – Gartner’s  Leaders Quadrant: Comverse ONE BSS 	
 2012, 2013 – International Business Awards (Stevie): Best New Product or Service of the Year Awards (DMM Policy Studio, Analytics) 
 2012 – Broadband Traffic Management (BBTM) Congress’s Best Integration of Traffic Management into OSS/BSS Architectures & Best Real-Time Charging Platforms for Customers 
 2012 – Frost & Sullivan Stratecast’s  Billing Global Product Line Strategy Award

References

External links

Companies established in 1997
Companies established in 2013
Companies disestablished in 2017
Software companies based in Massachusetts
Companies based in Middlesex County, Massachusetts
Companies formerly listed on the Nasdaq
Telecommunications companies of Israel
Telecommunications companies of the United States